Robert Alexander Smith is the current kit manager at  club Middlesbrough. He was previously a football player for several years with the same club and a player manager of Welsh club Bangor City.

An apprentice fitter before he became a footballer, Smith was on the books at Middlesbrough for four years before he made his first team debut. His debut came as a substitute in a 4–2 win over Bristol City in March 1966. He was in and out of the side for much of his career. He was transfer listed in May 1967 but stuck around, turning down a move to Blackburn Rovers in September 1971.

Smith eventually left Teesside in June 1972, becoming player-manager of Welsh side Bangor City. He returned to league football with Darlington in 1974.

He later fixed his sights on Non-League football, where his posts included a stint as player-coach with the Guisborough Town side that reached the FA Vase final, as well as being assistant to former Middlesbrough defender Peter Creamer at Evenwood Town in 1991. He later ran a sports shop, before returning to Middlesbrough during the 1996–97 season as their kit manager.

References
 
 

1944 births
Bangor City F.C. players
Darlington F.C. players
Living people
Middlesbrough F.C. non-playing staff
Middlesbrough F.C. players
People from Billingham
Footballers from County Durham
Guisborough Town F.C. players
English footballers
English Football League players
Bangor City F.C. managers
English football managers
Footballers from Yorkshire
Association football defenders